Janne Seppänen (born May 15, 1995) is a Finnish professional ice hockey forward currently playing for KOOVEE of the Mestis.

Seppänen was a member of Ilves's academy from 2014 to 2016 before spending the 2016–17 season on loan with LeKi in Mestis. On April 26, 2017, he joined Peliitat on a permanent transfer but returned to LeKi two months later. On June 3, 2019, Seppänen signed for KOOVEE. On December 28, he was loaned to Ilves, with whom he played two games.

On August 8, 2020, Seppänen moved to Slovakia to sign for HC Nové Zámky of the Tipos Extraliga.

Career statistics

Regular season and playoffs

References

External links
 

1995 births
Living people
Finnish ice hockey forwards
Ilves players
KOOVEE players
Lempäälän Kisa players
HC Nové Zámky players
Peliitat Heinola players
People from Porvoo
Finnish expatriate ice hockey players in Slovakia
Sportspeople from Uusimaa
Finnish expatriate ice hockey players in Germany